Katawixi (Catawishi) is a Katukinian language formerly spoken in Amazonas, Brazil.  It is nearly extinct among the known populations of Katawixi people, though an uncontacted group nearby may be Katawixi-speaking (Queixalós & Anjos G.S. 2007:29, cited in Hammarström 2010:194).
Only a handful of isolated tribes still speak this language.

References  

Languages of Brazil
Katukinan languages